Central Park Metro Station is a station of the Kolkata Metro in Salt Lake Sector - I, an eastern neighbourhood of Kolkata, India. The elevated structure is located above the 3rd Avenue between Central Park and Bikash Bhawan. This station serves the Central Park and other government offices situated in Sector I, Salt Lake.

Station

Layout

Connections

Auto

Bus 
Bus route number 44A, 206, 211B, 215A/1, 239, 260, KB16, KB22, K1, S171 (Mini), S16, S30A etc. serve the station.

Air 
Netaji Subhash Chandra Bose International Airport is  via VIP Road.

See also
List of Kolkata Metro stations

References 

Kolkata Metro stations
Railway stations in Kolkata